The Vietnam Fed Cup team represents Vietnam in Fed Cup tennis competition and are governed by the Vietnam Tennis Federation. They have not competed since 2014.

History
Vietnam competed in its first Fed Cup in 2013. They finished 5th in the Asia/Oceania Zone Group II round-robin and managed to secure a place in the group after beating Malaysia in the play-off match. The team continued to finish last in the Asia/Oceania Zone Group II group stage and defeated Iran in the play-offs.

Players

See also
Fed Cup
Vietnam Davis Cup team

External links

Billie Jean King Cup teams
Fed Cup
Fed Cup